Henry Staunton may refer to:

 Henry Staunton (businessman) (born 1948), British businessman
 Henry Staunton (priest) (1746–1814), Irish priest and first president of St. Patrick's, Carlow College
 Henry de Staunton, English medieval professor of canon law and university chancellor